Events in the year 1758 in Norway.

Incumbents
Monarch: Frederick V

Events

Arts and literature

Births
3 March - Jens Schou Fabricius, politician (died 1841)
15 March - Magdalene Sophie Buchholm, poet (died 1825)
23 April - Nils Christian Frederik Hals, military officer (died 1838)

Deaths
5 November - Hans Egede, Lutheran missionary (born 1686)

See also